Raw Deal is a 1986 American action film directed by John Irvin, from a story of Sergio Leone's screenwriters Luciano Vincenzoni and Sergio Donati, and starring Arnold Schwarzenegger, Kathryn Harrold, Darren McGavin and Sam Wanamaker. The film was released in North America on June 6, 1986. The film tells the story of an elderly and embittered high-ranking FBI chief, Harry Shannon, who wants to get revenge against a Mafia organization and sends a former FBI agent and now small-town sheriff Mark Kaminski to destroy the organization from the inside.

The film received negative reviews, grossing $16.2 million domestically against its $8–10 million budget.

Plot
On December 16, 1985, in a remote wooded cabin, a mob informant is under protection by the FBI. They are ambushed by a hit squad who brutally slaughter the bodyguards and the witness. One of the agents killed is Blair Shannon, son of FBI Agent Harry Shannon, who vows revenge.

After capturing a man posing as a motorcycle cop, small-town sheriff Mark Kaminski goes home to his alcoholic wife Amy, who resents what their lives have been reduced to; Kaminski once worked for the FBI, but five years ago he brutally beat a suspect who sexually assaulted and murdered a young girl. Kaminski was given the option to "resign or be prosecuted" by ambitious prosecutor Marvin Baxter, who is now Special Federal Prosecutor heading up a committee investigating the dealings of Luigi Patrovita, the strongest of the Chicago Outfit Dons.

Due to a leak within the FBI ranks causing their agents to be killed, Shannon recruits Kaminski for an unsanctioned assignment to infiltrate and dismantle Patrovita's organization. Kaminski fakes his own death in a chemical plant explosion and poses as convicted felon Joseph P. Brenner. He manages to get an audience with Patrovita's right-hand man Paulo Rocca, and convinces them of his worth by harassing Martin Lamanski, a rival mob boss who is trying to move in on his former boss Patrovita's territory. While at Patrovita's casino, hidden in a basement level of a high class hotel, he makes the acquaintance of Monique, who works for Rocca's top lieutenant Max Keller.

Kaminski continues to work his way into the good graces of the Patrovita family, including devising a plan that recovers $100 million of heroin and cash seized by the feds from one of Patrovita's hideouts and simultaneously assisting in Lamanski's assassination. Keller isn't convinced that 'Brenner' is who he says and manages to find proof of the deception, showing Kaminski's photo to a police informant who previously arrested the real Brenner. The leak the FBI has been looking for is revealed to be Baxter, who is forced to stay close to Patrovita. Kaminski accompanies Keller to a cemetery for a hit job, but discovers that the target is Shannon, forcing Kaminski to blow his cover and kill Keller. In the ensuing shootout, Shannon is severely wounded and crippled.

Kaminski escapes with Monique's assistance. He tells her to go to the airport and wait for him. After gathering an arsenal of firearms, Kaminski raids one of Patrovita's gravel pits, killing everyone and stealing a large amount of drug money. He then sets off for Patrovita's casino, where he embarks on a killing spree, single-handedly wiping out all his soldiers, including the men directly responsible for the murder of Blair and his fellow FBI agents. Rocca and Patrovita retreat to a back room, but Rocca is cut down in a barrage of gunfire. Patrovita flees into an office pleading for his life, but Kaminski mercilessly guns him down. On his way out, he encounters a whimpering Baxter who tries to talk his way out by apologizing for what happened five years ago. Kaminski responds to Baxter by saying that because of him a lot of people are dead, and now it’s his turn and offers him a gun with the same line Baxter gave him five years earlier: "Resign, or be prosecuted. Any way you want it." Kaminski starts to walk off, and when Baxter attempts to shoot him, Kaminski turns and shoots Baxter dead in self-defense.  After driving to the airport, Kaminski hands a duffel bag containing $250,000 in cash to Monique and gets her on a chartered plane, telling her she is free and can start a new life with no obligations to anyone.

During the aftermath, Kaminski is reinstated with the FBI and is reunited with a pregnant Amy. Kaminski visits a despondent Shannon, who refuses to undergo physical therapy. In order to thank Shannon for helping him, Kaminski asks him to be his child's godfather in exchange for completing his therapy, which Shannon accepts.

Cast

Production
The film was originally produced so that Dino De Laurentiis could inject some quick cash into his long gestating project Total Recall, a film for which De Laurentiis had owned the rights, and one in which Schwarzenegger would later take the leading role. Partly due to the poor box office performance of Raw Deal, De Laurentiis would eventually file for bankruptcy and the rights to Total Recall were sold to Carolco Pictures. At the time, Schwarzenegger was still under contract with De Laurentiis for a number of Conan the Barbarian sequels, and in exchange for dissolving this multi-picture agreement, Schwarzenegger agreed to star in Raw Deal. Initially, Schwarzenegger was more interested in doing Total Recall but De Laurentiis objected as he did not feel that Schwarzenegger was right for the leading role. Patrick Swayze was cast before De Laurentiis' bankruptcy.

Filming was done on location in Chicago, Castle Hayne, North Carolina and Wilmington, North Carolina at the De Laurentiis Entertainment Group Studios. The film was originally intended to be called "Let's Make a Deal", and during production and filming this was changed to "Triple Identity". This referenced the fact that the lead character goes from being an FBI agent, to a small-town sheriff, and then to an undercover operative. In the end Raw Deal was the chosen title, in an attempt to make the film sound more like a regular action film.

Release

Home media
Raw Deal was released to DVD by 20th Century Fox Home Entertainment on June 20, 2003 as a Region 1 widescreen DVD and to Blu-ray on June 28, 2010 by Paramount Home Entertainment as a multi-region widescreen Blu-ray.
Studiocanal 4K UHD release 24 Oct. 2022

Reception

Box office
Raw Deal released in the United States on June 6, 1986 and made $5,438,978 in its opening weekend. It went on to gross a total of $16,209,459 in the United States.

Though the film made a decent profit at the box office and was a modest success, its earnings were considered a disappointment.

Critical response
Roger Ebert gave the film 1.5 stars out of four and wrote, "This plot is so simple (and has been told so many times before), that perhaps the most amazing achievement of 'Raw Deal' is its ability to screw it up. This movie didn't just happen to be a mess; the filmmakers had to work to make it so confusing." Vincent Canby of The New York Times wrote that the film "isn't exactly Oscar material. It does nothing for the cause of nonviolence. It will warm the hearts of gun lobbyists everywhere, and its final body count may be even higher than that in Mr. Stallone's 'Cobra.' Yet 'Raw Deal' somehow manages to be measurably less offensive. At times, it's almost funny — intentionally." Todd McCarthy of Variety reported, "Comic book crime meller suffers from an irredeemably awful script, and even director John Irvin's engaging sense of how absurd the proceedings are can't work an alchemist's magic." Writing in the Los Angeles Times, Sheila Benson began, "Has it come to this? That we can feel vaguely cheered that Raw Deal (citywide), where the bodies again pile up like cordwood, is a better made movie than Cobra?" However, she praised Schwarzenegger, saying that his strength as an actor is "not that he can toss grown men over ceiling beams, but that he has a vein of sweetness and self-deprecation that no amount of mayhem can obliterate ... it has shone from him since Pumping Iron, it has allowed him to surmount silly and unwise pieces of action (such as the drunk scenes in one of the Conans and here), and even his own awkwardness as an actor." Gene Siskel of the Chicago Tribune gave the film 1 star out of 4 and noted that it had "essentially the same story" as Cobra, "but it is told with so many superfluous characters that we're never really sure whose side a few key people are on. Needless to say, in a film filled with punch-outs, we very quickly don't care." Paul Attanasio of The Washington Post dismissed the film as "a mostly tedious, cheaply made shoot-em-up" that "recycles the clichés that have long been the cud of television cop dramas." Pauline Kael of The New Yorker called it "reprehensible and enjoyable, the kind of movie that makes you feel brain dead after two minutes—after which point you're ready to laugh at its mixture of trashiness, violence, and startlingly silly crude humor."

Raw Deal holds a rating of 31% on Rotten Tomatoes based on 16 reviews. Audiences polled by CinemaScore gave the film an average grade of "B" on an A+ to F scale.

See also
 List of American films of 1986
 Arnold Schwarzenegger filmography

References

External links
 
 
 

1986 films
1986 action films
1980s American films
1980s English-language films
American action films
American films about revenge
De Laurentiis Entertainment Group films
Fictional portrayals of the Chicago Police Department
Films about the Federal Bureau of Investigation
Films directed by John Irvin
Films produced by Martha De Laurentiis
Films set in 1985
Films set in Chicago
Films set in North Carolina
Films shot in Chicago
Films shot in North Carolina
Films with screenplays by Gary DeVore
Films with screenplays by Luciano Vincenzoni
Films with screenplays by Norman Wexler
Films with screenplays by Sergio Donati